Derbyshire county cricket opening season was in 1871 when Derbyshire County Cricket Club first competed in the county competition, having been founded the previous November.

Foundation

Derbyshire CCC was formed for the county of Derbyshire on 4 November 1870 at a meeting in the Derby Guildhall. The Earl of Chesterfield who had played for and against All England Eleven was the first President, George Henry Strutt was vice president and Walter Boden, who had campaigned for the club's foundation for three years, was secretary. When Chesterfield died in 1871, William Jervis, a well connected lawyer, became president. The main problem that arose from the beginning was that of arranging matches against other counties. For the first three seasons only Lancashire County Cricket Club  were willing to make fixtures.

1871 season
Derbyshire CCC played two matches in its first year, both against Lancashire CCC and joined the (then unofficial) County Championship. One match was won, and the other lost.

The club's first captain was Samuel Richardson, a gentleman's outfitter in the town of Derby. Derbyshire's bowling strength came from the professionals Dove Gregory  who had played for a Derbyshire team in the 1850s, William Hickton a former Lancashire player and John Platts who was on the ground staff of MCC. Amateurs who began long careers with the club were Robert Smith (future captain) a farmer, John Smith a solicitor, Unwin Sowter a miller and baker, John Tilson a lace maker and John Burnham a clerk. Shorter careers were enjoyed by Thomas Attenborough a cattle dealer and Joseph Davidson a miner. Single appearances were made by Rev, Arthur Wilmot local rector, Edward Foley Oxford University student and vicar's son and James Billyeald a commercial traveller.  Some had played for Gentlemen of Derbyshire, South Derbyshire and Derby Town.

In this match the Lancashire batsmen were destroyed in their first innings by the pace of the Derbyshire fast bowler, Dove Gregory, who took six wickets for nine runs. They  made a record low innings score of 25. Derbyshire replied with 147, and Lancashire failed in their second innings to achieve a combined total that surpassed it. In the return match in August, the club's first at the County Ground, Derbyshire replied with 80 to Lancashire's first innings score of 116, and with 58 to their second innings score of 84. Lancashire's Arthur Appleby did great damage with 6 for 38 and 7 for 21

Matches

Batting performances

Bowling performances

Wicket Keeper
Samuel  Richardson; catches 1, stumping 1

See also
Derbyshire County Cricket Club seasons
1871 English cricket season

References

1871 in English cricket
Derbyshire County Cricket Club seasons
English cricket seasons in the 19th century